Marvin William Bailey (born March 6, 1994), known professionally as Fredo, is a British rapper and singer from Queen's Park, London. He had a UK number 1 single in 2018 with fellow rapper Dave, called "Funky Friday".

Early life 
Fredo grew up in Queen's Park, London and lived on West London's Mozart Estate where he was surrounded by gang violence and crime.

During Fredo's youth, he listened to Giggs and 50 Cent, stating "I remember I used to bang Get Rich or Die Tryin' every day".

Career 
Fredo released his first track "They Ain't 100" in March 2016. Three weeks later he went to prison, on a charge he later beat. Whilst he was in prison, the track gained popularity, with radio play and millions of views. Inspired by its success, and despite a second stint in prison, he persisted in his newfound rapping and recording career, releasing two mixtapes, Get Rich or Get Recalled in 2017, and in 2018 Tables Turn, which reached the Top 10 in the album charts. He also appeared as a featured artist on tracks by Kojo Funds and Young T & Bugsey, as well as on Dave's 2018 hit single "Funky Friday".

Fredo's first full-length album, Third Avenue, was released on 1 February 2019. Produced mostly by JB, it marked Fredo's debut on RCA's Since '93 imprint. It included "Love You for That", a track dedicated to his mother and apologising for not being the perfect son. The album takes its title from the West London housing estate he grew up on.

In January 2021, Fredo released his second album Money Can't Buy Happiness, which contained features from Pop Smoke, Dave, Summer Walker and Young Adz. It peaked at number two on the UK Albums Chart.

On 24 June 2021, Fredo announced his third album Independence Day which released on 5 August 2021. The album announced that his music would be released independently.

Legal issues
Fredo spent time in prison on remand in 2016 and 2017, both times for stabbing-related charges that were dropped before reaching court. He has also been the victim of a stabbing attack, having been stabbed four times on one occasion on his local high street.

Discography 

Studio albums
 Third Avenue (2019)
 Money Can't Buy Happiness (2021)
 Independence Day (2021)

References 

Living people
Rappers from London
English male rappers
British trap musicians
Gangsta rappers
1994 births